We Are Not Children (French: Nous ne sommes plus des enfants) is a 1934 French comedy film directed by Augusto Genina and starring Gaby Morlay, Claude Dauphin and Jean Wall.

Cast
 Gaby Morlay as Roberte 
 Claude Dauphin as Jean Servin 
 Jean Wall as Roger, l'ami 
 Pierre Larquey as M. Breton 
 Léon Arvel
 Marcelle Monthil
 Pauline Carton
 Yvonne Drines
 Madeleine Guitty
 Lucienne Le Marchand
 Nina Myral
 Henry Houry

References

Bibliography 
  Frank Burke. A Companion to Italian Cinema. John Wiley & Sons, 2017.

External links 
 

1934 comedy films
French comedy films
1934 films
1930s French-language films
Films directed by Augusto Genina
French black-and-white films
1930s French films